Mitigation banking is the preservation, enhancement, restoration or creation (PERC) of a wetland, stream, or habitat conservation area which offsets, or compensates for, expected adverse impacts to similar nearby ecosystems. The goal is to replace the exact function and value of specific habitats (i.e. biodiversity, or other ecosystem services) that would be adversely affected by a proposed activity or project. The public interest is served when enforcement agencies require more habitat as mitigation, often referred to as a mitigation ratio, than is adversely impacted by management or development of nearby acreage.

Wetland Mitigation Credits do not convey any interest in the real estate that hosts the mitigation bank.  Wetland Credits are treated, for accounting purposes, as intangible personal property.

Mitigation banking in the US

Policies
In the United States, federal agencies (under section 404 of the Clean Water Act), as well as many state and local governments, require mitigation for the disturbance or destruction of wetland, stream, or endangered species habitat. Once approved by regulatory agencies, a mitigation bank may sell credits to developers whose projects will impact these various ecosystems.

The USEPA identifies four components of a mitigation bank as: the bank site, the bank instrument, the Interagency Review Team (IRT), and the service area. The bank site identifies the acreage of the area preserved, enhanced, restored, or created. The bank instrument is the formal agreement between regulatory agencies and the bank owner which establishes liability and success of the mitigation bank. The IRT regulates approval and oversight of the mitigation bank. The service area identifies the area in which the bank can sell credits for permitted impacts. Mitigation banks with multiple credit types (habitat types) can have different service areas for each credit type.

Mitigation credits 
Credits are designated by an interagency Mitigation Bank Review Team (MBRT). The MBRT evaluates and permits a proposed Mitigation Bank.  They also determine the number of potential mitigation credits a bank may earn and sell. The MBRT may include representatives of various federal, state and/or local government agencies, including: U.S. Army Corps of Engineers, National Marine Fisheries Service, Environmental Protection Agency, US Fish and Wildlife Service, State Environmental Protection Divisions, Local Water Management Districts, County Environmental Departments and the Soil Conservation Service.

A mitigation bank generates credits for the amount and quality of habitat the bank site improves. Credits are units of exchange defined as the ecological value associated with converting a naturally occurring wetland or other specific habitat type, for economic purposes. Mitigation credits to compensate for riparian impacts may be assigned in relation to the linear distance of a stream functioning at the highest possible capacity within the watershed of the bank. Mitigation credits are determined based on bank acreage, functional units, and other assessments. The estimated potential number of credits a bank may earn can vary based on ecological performance of the bank. The Interagency Review Team periodically releases bank credits as the bank meets certain performance milestones. This happens over the course of the "establishment period", which lasts around 10 to 12 years. When the IRT releases potential bank credits, they become available credits meaning they can be purchased for ecological offset.

RIBITS (Regulatory In lieu fee and Bank Information Tracking System) is a website created by the USACE with information on mitigation and conservation banks and in-lieu fee (ILF) program sites. The website contains local and national policies and procedures for mitigation banking. It houses information about all mitigation and ILF sites including site documents, mitigation credit availability, and service areas as well as tracks all credit transactions.

History 
Section 404 of the 1972 Clean Water Act works to protect wetlands directly by mandating that in order to negatively impact a wetland, a person must first receive a permit from the US Army Corps of Engineers (the Corps). In this process, the developer submits an application, called a Public Notice, to their respective district of the USACE requesting to carry out the project and associated ecological impacts. The Corps evaluates the probable impacts and solicits comments on public notices to use when making the decision whether to issue, modify, or deny a permit.

The Corps initially preferred on-site mitigation to preserve the wetland functions at their location. Unfortunately, this approach had a low long-term success rate. A 1993 Memorandum of Agreement gave national guidance on mitigation banking by instead supporting a market-oriented method. It supported off-site wetland mitigation in which a permittee purchases mitigation credits from a third-party mitigation bank. This entity, private, governmental, or non-governmental, promotes the no-net-loss policy by restoring or creating an area of wetland into a mitigation bank and selling compensatory mitigation credits to permittees. By 2000, there were over 230 private mitigation banks and 180 state-run mitigation banks.

Advantages
There are several advantages to drawing on mitigation bank credits.  For example:
 Mitigation banks place a perpetual conservation easement on the land, with a trust fund specifically dedicated to long term management of natural resources inherent to the bank. By securing mitigation credits from neighboring ecosystems many large landowners, including the government, are able to maintain a property in its current management state (e.g. grazing, timber removal, low-impact recreation or education) while retaining ecological functionality, also called ecosystem services, important to the public interest.
 Mitigation banks usually provide greater benefits than on-site or small parcel mitigation efforts.  Landowners PERC properties that are of higher ecological quality than the small parcel impacts they compensate for.  By consolidating activities necessary to create, maintain, and monitor mitigation, banks are able to provide superior ecosystem services at a reduced cost. 
 Mitigation banks provide many functional business advantages, allowing for ease of development.  They allow a developer to maximize the use of a preferred development site rather than breaking up the site into sub-optimal property uses. Because mitigation bank credits are negotiated prior to development, hence prior to impact, purchasing credits from a mitigation bank decreases permitting time while also ensuring no net loss of habitat.  The cost is often lower than other alternatives.  Both regulatory and long term management risk is passed from developer to mitigation banker.

Challenges 
Despite policies mandating no net loss of habitat value and function, agencies have had difficulty ensuring that mitigation programs are managed.  Wetland mitigation programs, for example, have in some cases been approved based on total numbers of acres rather than in terms of equivalence in ecological value or function.  Merely assuming that the compensation involves a similar number of acres falls short of true equivalence unless the replacement ecological functions supplied by those acres are also the same.

A challenge faced by regulatory agencies is giving correct economic or monetary value for ecological loss, even through the use of environmental assessment techniques. Although mitigation banks have to be located in the same watershed as the impact in order to be considered adequate compensation, mitigation banks are often located far from the actual site of impact. Therefore, it is difficult to retain the original value and function.

Taxation 
The creation of a mitigation bank will require the owner of the land to convey a perpetual conservation easement prohibiting future development of the property.  The Internal Revenue Service has viewed the filing of a perpetual conservation easement in return for mitigation credits as a sale or exchange of property under section 1001 for federal income tax purposes.

See also

References 

Banking
Habitat management equipment and methods
Environmental economics
Environmental mitigation